Lerchenfeld Glacier is a glacier flowing in a west-northwesterly direction between Bertrab Nunatak and the Littlewood Nunataks in Antarctica. It coalesces with the southern flank of Schweitzer Glacier before the combined flow discharges into the head of Vahsel Bay. The glacier was discovered by the Second German Antarctic Expedition, 1911–12, under Wilhelm Filchner, who named this feature for Count Hugo von und zu Lerchenfeld-Köfering, a supporter of the expedition.

See also
 List of glaciers in the Antarctic
 Glaciology

References

 

Glaciers of Coats Land